Reilly Smith (born April 1, 1991) is a Canadian professional ice hockey right winger and alternate captain for the Vegas Golden Knights of the National Hockey League (NHL).

Growing up in Toronto, Smith played junior hockey with St. Michael's College School before playing three seasons of NCAA Division I collegiate hockey with the Miami University's RedHawks in the Central Collegiate Hockey Association (CCHA). During his time in college, Smith was drafted in the third round, 69th overall, by the Dallas Stars in the 2009 NHL Entry Draft. Upon joining the Stars in 2012, he played one full season with the team before being included in a blockbuster trade between Dallas and the Boston Bruins, which sent him, Loui Eriksson, Joe Morrow and Matt Fraser to Boston in exchange for Tyler Seguin, Rich Peverley and Ryan Button. After a short time in Boston, Smith joined the Florida Panthers for two seasons before landing with the Golden Knights. 

Smith was born into an athletic family; he is the younger brother of current New Jersey Devils defenceman Brendan Smith.

Early life
Smith was born on April 1, 1991, in Etobicoke, Ontario, Canada to parents Lester and Deidre Smith. Smith was born into an athletic family; his older brother  Brendan Smith plays for the New Jersey Devils and his brother Rory competes in the National Lacrosse League (NLL). The three all played minor hockey in the Etobicoke neighbourhood of Mimico with the Faustina Sports Club, then all played for the St. Michael's Buzzers minor juniors.

Playing career

Amateur 

Growing up, Smith played junior hockey with the Toronto Nationals U16 AAA and St. Michael's College School in Toronto, Ontario.c While with St. Michael's, he participated in the CJHL All-Star Game and served as both captain and assistant captain during his career. In his final season with the team, Smith was named their Most Valuable Player after recording 75 points. Prior to entering his freshman season with the Miami University's RedHawks, Smith won a bronze medal at the 2008 World Junior A Challenge and was drafted in the third round, 69th overall, by the Dallas Stars in the 2009 NHL Entry Draft.

Following the draft, Smith began his freshman season with the Redhawks in the Central Collegiate Hockey Association (CCHA) while majoring in sport studies. Although he admitted to being shocked at the speed of collegiate hockey, Smith recorded eight goals and 20 points in 43 games. During the season, he was also selected to take part in Canada's National Junior Team selection camp. 

Upon returning to the RedHawks for his sophomore season, Smith experienced a breakout year and recorded 54 points in 38 games. While playing alongside played alongside seniors Carter Camper and Andy Miele, Smith led the nation's underclassmen in goals and points while also ranking seventh overall in the country for points. As a result of his success during his sophomore year, Smith was named to the All-Florida College Classic Team, voted first team all-CCHA, named to the CCHA all-Tournament Team, College Hockey News Second-Team All-America, and INCH Third-Team All-America.

Smith returned to the RedHawks for his junior year, where he recorded a career-high 30 goals in 39 games. As a result of his success, Smith was named a Hobey Baker Award finalist, First-Team All-America, and finalist for the RBC Financial Group CCHA Player of the Year.

Dallas Stars
On March 25, 2012, Smith relinquished his final year at Miami to sign a three-year, entry-level contract with the Dallas Stars. He made his NHL debut on March 28, 2012, against the Edmonton Oilers and skated for five shifts. Smith played 4:05 minutes of ice time and recorded one shot on goal in the 3–1 loss. He played two more games with the Stars before they concluded their regular season. 

After attending the Stars' 2012 training camp, Smith was reassigned to their American Hockey League (AHL) affiliate, the Texas Stars. During his first 11 games in the AHL, he had recorded three assists. He was promoted to Dallas for the season once play resumed in January 2013 and scored his first career NHL goal on February 15, 2013, against Cory Schneider of the Vancouver Canucks. His second goal came a few days later in a 4–3 loss to the Calgary Flames. As a result of his early success, Smith was promoted to a top six position in February and played left wing on a line with Derek Roy and Loui Eriksson. After playing in 28 games for Dallas, and recording six points, he was reassigned to the AHL alongside defenseman Joe Morrow. He was recalled shortly thereafter after recording one goal and one assist during a game against the Houston Aeros.

Boston Bruins

In July 2013, Smith was included in a blockbuster trade between Dallas and the Boston Bruins, which sent him, Loui Eriksson, Joe Morrow and Matt Fraser to Boston in exchange for Tyler Seguin, Rich Peverley and Ryan Button. During the pre-season, Smith was placed on the Bruins' third line with Chris Kelly and Carl Söderberg. However, as a result of injuries, Smith was moved up to a line with Patrice Bergeron and Loui Eriksson. He finished the regular season with 19 goals and 30 assists which included 17 goals and 17 assists throughout November. As a result of his success, the New England Sports Network (NESN) TV network named Smith the 45th annual "7th Player." The "7th Player" is awarded to the Boston Bruin who most exceeded all expectations that season, as voted by the team's fans.

The following year, Smith finished with 13 goals and 27 assists, plus four goals and an assist in 12 playoff games.

Florida Panthers 
On July 1, 2015, Smith was traded by the Bruins, along with Marc Savard's contract, to the Florida Panthers in exchange for Jimmy Hayes. During his first season with the team, Smith recorded a new career high 50 points in 82 games and tied for third on the team in goal scoring. On July 3, 2016, Smith signed a five-year, $25 million contract extension with the Panthers. Following the contract extension, Smith had a self described "disappointing year" after he recorded 15 goals and 22 assists in the 2016–17 season.

Vegas Golden Knights 
On June 21, 2017, Smith was traded at the 2017 NHL Expansion Draft to the Vegas Golden Knights due to salary cap issues. Both he and teammate Jonathan Marchessault were acquired by the Golden Knights, with the Panthers receiving a fourth-round pick in the 2018 NHL Entry Draft. During his tenure in Florida, Smith had 87 points in 162 games. Following the trade, Smith began the 2017–18 season as a winger with William Karlsson and Jonathan Marchessault. Their line received early praise for being amongst the team's best lines, with them all scoring high by November. Upon entering January, Smith had become a prominent fixture on the first line as they had combined for 19 goals and 24 assists. The following month, Smith was recognized as an NHL Third Star of the Month of February after posting 20 points in 14 games. Smith would go on to score a career-high 60 points in the regular season as the Knights advanced all the way to the 2018 Stanley Cup Finals. During their postseason run, Smith scored five goals and 17 assists.

Following his career-high season, Smith stayed consistent with his offensive abilities and recorded the second-best statistical season of his career. He tied Jonathan Marchessault for the team lead in assists with 34 and surpassed the 50-point mark for the second season in a row. Upon returning to the Knights, Smith remained with Marchessault and Karlsson and recorded his 100th career NHL goal in a 4–2 win over the Pittsburgh Penguins on October 11, 2018. Later that season, he also appeared in his 500th career NHL game, while also maintaining eight points in his past three games. As the Knights qualified for the Stanley Cup playoffs for the second consecutive year, Smith recorded one goal and five assists in their series against the San Jose Sharks.

At the time of the pausing of the 2019–20 season due to the COVID-19 pandemic, Smith had scored a career high 27 goals in 71 games played. After surpassing the Chicago Blackhawks in the first round of the 2020 Stanley Cup playoffs, Smith tied with Mark Stone for team lead in points. As the playoffs continued, Smith experienced an 11 game goal drought which was snapped in Game 5 of the Western Conference Final against the Dallas Stars. 

Following the naming of Mark Stone as team captain, Smith was appointed an alternate captain alongside Alex Pietrangelo. While playing in his 628 career game, Smith recorded his first professional hat-trick in a 4–1 win over the St. Louis Blues on May 9, 2021.

On July 13, 2022, Smith signed a three-year, $15 million contract to remain with the Golden Knights.

Career statistics

Awards and honours

References

External links 

 

1991 births
Living people
Boston Bruins players
Canadian ice hockey right wingers
Dallas Stars draft picks
Dallas Stars players
Florida Panthers players
Miami RedHawks men's ice hockey players
Sportspeople from Etobicoke
Ice hockey people from Toronto
Texas Stars players
Vegas Golden Knights players
AHCA Division I men's ice hockey All-Americans